The stayer race is one of the 2 motor-paced racing disciplines of the annual UEC European Track Championships.

In the past, private organizers of track cycling events organized championships (European Criterion or Winter championship) during the Winter months. The first European championship Stayer was held in 1896. 

The sub federation for professional cycling of the UCI, the FICP organized official European championships (called Championnats d'Hiver) between 1972 and 1990.

Since 1995 the European Cycling Union is responsible for this event.

Men's Medalists

References 

 
European cycling championships
European Track Championships